Edwin Harvey Bryant (12 September 1886—24 October 1948) was an English cricketer who played 16 first-class games for Worcestershire in the 1920s. He top-scored with 41 in the second innings of his debut against Yorkshire,
but his career was not successful.

Bryant made 63 in the first innings against Essex in June 1924,
but this was to prove his only half-century. Indeed, his duck in the second innings of that match began a dreadful sequence of scores: he was dismissed for nought five times in six innings (making just 5 in the other), and for single figures in the four innings immediately thereafter.
He played his last match against Nottinghamshire in June 1925; his final innings was another duck.

Notes

References
Edwin Bryant from CricketArchive

English cricketers
Worcestershire cricketers
1886 births
1948 deaths
Sportspeople from Bromsgrove